— Opening lines of Rudyard Kipling's White Man's Burden, first published this year

Nationality words link to articles with information on the nation's poetry or literature (for instance, Irish or France).

Events
 March 20 – Welsh "tramp-poet" W. H. Davies loses his foot trying to jump a freight train at Renfrew, Ontario.
 William Hughes Mearns writes "Antigonish" this year; it won't be published until 1922.
 Romesh Chunder Dutt's translation of the Ramayana into English verse is first published, in London.
 Shinshisha ("New Poetry Society") founded by Yosano Tekkan in Japan.

Works published

Australia
 W. T. Goodge, Hits! Skits! and Jingles!

Canada
 Frances Jones Bannerman, Milestones. London.
 William Wilfred Campbell, Beyond the Hills of Dream. Boston: Houghton, Mifflin.
 Fidelis, Lays of the "True North," and Other Canadian Poems.
 John Frederic Herbin, The Marshlands
 Archibald Lampman, Alcyone, including "City of the End of Things", the author died while the book was being printed.
 Thomas O'Hagan, Songs of the Settlement
 Frederick George Scott, Poems Old and New (Toronto: William Briggs).
 Francis Sherman, 'The Deserted City: Stray Sonnets. Boston: Copeland and Day.
 Arthur Stringer, The Loom of Destiny.
Anthologies
 Northland Lyrics, William Carman Roberts, Theodore Roberts & Elizabeth Roberts Macdonald; selected and arranged with a prologue by Charles G.D. Roberts and an epilogue by Bliss Carman. Boston: Small, Maynard & Co.

United Kingdom
 Hilaire Belloc, A Moral Alphabet
 Laurence Binyon, Second Book of London Visions (see also First Book of London Visions 1896)
 Wilfrid Scawen Blunt, Satan Absolved
 Gordon Bottomley, Poems at White-Nights
 Robert Buchanan, The New Rome: Poems and ballads of our empire
 John Davidson, The Last Ballad, and Other Poems
 Lord Alfred Douglas (anonymously in 1st edition), The City of the Soul
 Ernest Dowson, Decorations: in Verse and Prose
 Rudyard Kipling:
 "The Absent-Minded Beggar"
 "The White Man's Burden", appears first in McClure's Magazine in the United States; it is parodied this same year in "The Brown Man's Burden", by Henry Labouchère in Truth, a publication in London; the parody is reprinted in the United States in Literary Digest 18 (February 25)
 Dora Sigerson, Ballads and Poems
 Arthur Symons:
 Images of Good and Evil
 The Symbolist Movement in Literature, first collected edition of essays
 W. B. Yeats, The Wind Among the Reeds including "Aedh Wishes for the Cloths of Heaven"; Irish poet published in the United Kingdom, (John Lane/Bodley Head)

United States
 Stephen Crane, War is Kind
 Paul Laurence Dunbar, Lyrics of the Hearthside, which included his poem "Sympathy"
 Hamlin Gillette, The Trail of the Goldseekers
 Louise Imogen Guiney, The Martyrs' Idyl
 Rudyard Kipling, "The White Man's Burden", appears first in McClure's; it is parodied this same year in "The Brown Man's Burden", by Henry Labouchère in Truth, a publication in London; the parody is reprinted in the United States in Literary Digest 18 (February 25)
 Edwin Markham, The Man with the Hoe and Other Poems
 Howard Llewellyn Swisher, Briar Blossoms: Being a Collection of a Few Verses and Some Prose
 Henry Timrod (died 1867), Complete Poems

Other in English
 John Le Gay Brereton, Landlopers, mostly prose, based on a walking tour with Dowell Philip O'Reilly; Australia
 W. B. Yeats, The Wind Among the Reeds including "Aedh Wishes for the Cloths of Heaven"; Irish poet published in the United Kingdom, The Wind Among the Reeds, (John Lane/Bodley Head)

Works published in other languages

France
 Francis Jammes:
Le Poète et l'oiseau ("The Poet and the Bird")
 La Jeune Fille nue, France
 Stéphane Mallarmé (died 1898), Poésies, originally published 1877, new edn with commentary by the poet
 Oscar Milosz, also known as O. V. de L. Milosz, Le Poème des décadences

Other languages
 José Santos Chocano, La epopeya del Morro, Peru
 Stefan George, Teppich des Lebens ("The Carpet of Life"); German
 Gregorio Martínez Sierra, Diálogos fantásticos ("Fantastic Dialogues"), Spain

Awards and honors

Births
Death years link to the corresponding "[year] in poetry" article:
 January 23 – Carlo Betocchi (died 1986), Italian poet
 January 26 – May Miller (died 1995) African American poet, playwright and educator
 February 17 – Jibanananda Das (died 1954), popular Bengali poet
 March 7 – Jun Ishikawa 石川淳 pen name of Ishikawa Kiyoshi, Ishikawa (died 1987), Japanese, Shōwa period modernist author, translator and literary critic
 March 25 – Jacques Audiberti (died 1965), French playwright, poet, novelist and exponent of the Theatre of the Absurd
 March 27 – Francis Ponge (died 1988), French academic, journalist and poet
 May 18 – D. Gwenallt Jones (died 1968), Welsh poet
 May 24
 Kazi Nazrul Islam (died 1976), Bengali poet and composer best known as the Bidrohi Kobi ("Rebel Poet"), popular among Bengalis and considered the national poet of Bangladesh
 Henri Michaux (died 1984), Belgian, French-language artist, writer and poet who became a French citizen
 May 27 – Raymond Knister died (1932), Canadian poet, novelist and short story writer
 June 6 – Hildegarde Flanner (died 1987), American poet, author and activist
 June 8 – Kaoru Maruyama 丸山 薫 (died 1974), Japanese
 July 4 – Benjamin Péret (died 1959), French poet and writer
 July 7 – Margaret Larkin (died 1967), American poet
 July 21 – Hart Crane (died 1932), American poet
 August 1 – F. R. Scott (died 1985), Canadian poet, intellectual and constitutional expert
 September 30 – Hendrik Marsman (died 1940), Dutch poet
 August 5 – Sakae Tsuboi 壺井栄 (died 1967), Japanese novelist and poet
 November 19 – Allen Tate (died 1979), American poet and member of the Fugitives and later the Southern Agrarians.
 December 9 – Léonie Adams (died 1988), American poet and Poetry Consultant to the Library of Congress
 Date not known:
 Jammuneshwar Khataniyar (died 1920), Indian, Assamese-language poet; a woman
 Dimbeshwar Neog (died 1966), Indian, Assamese-language poet
 Constance Woodrow (died 1937), English-born Canadian poet

Deaths
Birth years link to the corresponding "[year] in poetry" article:
 February 10 – Archibald Lampman, 37 (born 1861), Canadian poet who dies while his book, Alcyone, is being printed (see "Works", above)
 April 16 – Emilio Jacinto, 23 (born 1875) Filipino revolutionary general and poet, of malaria
 April 26 – Dragotin Kette, 23 (born 1876), Slovene poet, of TB
 July 20 – Frances Laughton Mace, 63 (born 1836) American poet
 November 16 – Vincas Kudirka, 40 (born 1858), Lithuanian physician, poet and national hero, of TB
 November 25 – Robert Lowry, 73 (born 1826), American hymnodist
 December 1 – Dolores Cabrera y Heredia, 71 (born 1828), Spanish Romantic poet and novelist, member of Hermandad Lírica

See also

 19th century in poetry
 19th century in literature
 List of years in poetry
 List of years in literature
 Victorian literature
 French literature of the 19th century
 Symbolist poetry
 Young Poland (Młoda Polska) a modernist period in Polish  arts and literature, roughly from 1890 to 1918
 Poetry
 Fin de siècle

Notes

19th-century poetry
Poetry